The Te Rangi Hiroa Medal is a social sciences award given by the Royal Society of New Zealand Te Apārangi. The medal was established in 1996 and is named in memory of Te Rangi Hīroa, also known as Sir Peter Buck, a New Zealand medical practitioner, anthropologist and Director of the Bishop Museum in Hawaii in the first half of the 20th century.

It was initially granted annually. It is currently a biennial award. It is awarded for work in one of four disciplines: historical approaches to societal transformation and change; current issues in cultural diversity and cohesion; social and economic policy and development; and medical anthropology (this last discipline was added in 2006). It was formerly awarded for each discipline in rotation; starting in 2017, it is awarded in any of the four disciplines in each round.

Recipients are:

1997: Joan Metge
1998: not awarded
1999: Jack Vowles
2000: not awarded
2001: Erik Newland Olssen
2003: Greta Regina Aroha Yates-Smith
2005: Alistair John Cluny Macpherson
2007: not awarded
2009: Ian Pool
2011: Colleen Ward
2013: not awarded
2015: Ruth Fitzgerald
2017: Tracey McIntosh and Murray Cox
2019: Edwina Pio
2021: Linda Waimarie Nikora

See also

 List of social sciences awards

References

1996 establishments in New Zealand
New Zealand awards
Royal Society of New Zealand
Social sciences awards